Patrick Galbraith and Paul Haarhuis were the defending champions, but Haarhuis did not compete this year. Galbraith teamed up with Ellis Ferreira and lost in second round to Trevor Kronemann and David Macpherson.

Mahesh Bhupathi and Leander Paes won the title by defeating Sébastien Lareau and Alex O'Brien 7–6, 6–3 in the final.

Seeds

Draw

Finals

Top half

Bottom half

References
 Official Results Archive (ATP)
 Official Results Archive (ITF)

Men's Doubles